Hostinger International, Ltd is an employee-owned web hosting provider and an ICANN-accredited domain registrar. Established in 2004, the company is headquartered in Lithuania and employs more than 1,000 people. Hostinger is the parent company of 000webhost, Hosting24, Zyro, and Niagahoster.

History 
Hostinger was founded in 2004 as Hosting Media.

In 2007, Hosting Media’s paid hosting offer was joined by a free web hosting service when the company founded 000webhost.

In 2008, the company launched Hosting24, a cPanel-based web hosting brand, in the United States. The data centers were located in Asheville, North Carolina, and the United Kingdom.

In 2011, Arnas Stuopelis joined the company as CEO. In the same year Hosting Media rebranded to Hostinger.

In 2013, Hostinger launched its subsidiary Niagahoster in Indonesia. It became one of the first hosting providers to offer tier-4 data centers.

In 2014, the company launched a Brazilian subsidiary, Weblink.

In 2019, Hostinger introduced a no-code, drag-and-drop website builder. Launched as a subsidiary under the name Zyro, the builder is supported by Hostinger’s hosting infrastructure and is aimed at small to medium-sized enterprises.

In 2021, private equity company ConHostinger acquired an approximately 31% controlling stake in Hostinger with the goal of enhancing the growth of the company.

References 

Web hosting
Companies established in 2004
Internet properties established in 2004